
Gmina Zbójno is a rural gmina (administrative district) in Golub-Dobrzyń County, Kuyavian-Pomeranian Voivodeship, in north-central Poland.

Villages
Gmina Zbójno contains the villages and settlements of Adamki, Ciechanówek, Ciepień, Działyń, Frankowo, Imbirkowo, Kazimierzowo, Kiełbzak, Klonowo, Laskowiec, Łukaszewo, Nowy Działyń, Obory, Podolina, Przystań, Pustki Działyńskie, Rembiesznica, Rembiocha, Rochal, Rudusk, Ruże, Sitno, Wielgie, Wojnowo, Zbójenko, Zbójno and Zosin.

Neighbouring gminas
Gmina Zbójno is bordered by the gminas of Brzuze, Chrostkowo, Ciechocin, Czernikowo, Golub-Dobrzyń, Kikół and Radomin.

References
Polish official population figures 2006

Zbojno
Golub-Dobrzyń County